The Röhm RG-14 is a double action, six shot revolver chambered in .22 LR formerly manufactured and sold by Röhm Gesellschaft of Sontheim/Brenz, Germany. One copy was used by John Hinckley Jr. to shoot Ronald Reagan on 30 March 1981. The RG-14 is known as a Saturday night special, a general category of cheap, low-quality handguns.

The RG-14 was available in a snubnose configuration with a 1.5" barrel as well as a more typical configuration with a 3" barrel.

Instead of having a swing out cylinder, the RG-14 featured a single pin that passed through the front of the frame, through the cylinder and into the back of the frame, meaning in order to reload the firearm, the pin must be unscrewed, removed entirely from the revolver and then threaded back into place after the cylinder has been reloaded. The firearm also does not have an ejector, meaning each round must be manually removed from the cylinder before reloading.

References

.22 LR revolvers
Revolvers of Germany